Danielle Victoria Rodriguez (born December 18, 1993) is an American basketball player and coach. After graduating from the University of Utah, she went on to play professionally in the Úrvalsdeild kvenna where she was named the Foreign Player of the Year in 2018 and led the league in assists in 2017 and 2019.

Playing career
Rodriguez played college basketball for the University of Utah. After graduating, she signed with Stjarnan in 2016. She had a standout season, averaging 23.4 points, 9.6 rebounds and league leading 5.9 assists during the regular season and leading Stjarnan to the playoffs. In the playoffs, Stjarnan were beaten in the first round by Snæfell.

She returned to Stjarnan the following season and continued her strong play. On January 21, 2018, Rodriguez had a triple-double, her third of the season, with 29 points, 19 rebounds and 17 assists in an 86–64 victory against Njarðvík. Despite her stellar play, Stjarnan missed out on the playoffs with a loss against Skallagrímur in the last game of the regular season. For the season she averaged 29.1 points, 11.5 rebounds and 8.8 assists and was named the Úrvalsdeild Foreign Player of the Year.

In June 2018, Rodriguez re-signed with Stjarnan for the 2018–2019 season. On October 31, she was one steal away from a quadruple-double in a victory against Valur. She finished the game with 23 points, 12 rebounds, 13 assists and 9 steals. On 16 January 2019, Rodriguez had 27 points, 15 rebounds and 13 assists, her fifth triple-double of the season, in an overtime victory against first-place KR. On 13 February, Rodriguez scored 33 points, including a three-point heave from just inside the half-court line to finish the first half, in Stjarnan's 103–82 win over Breiðablik in the Icelandic Cup semi-finals, propelling Stjarnan to the Cup finals for the first time in its history. She also helped Stjarnan reach the Úrvalsdeild playoffs for the first time where it eventually bowed out against Keflavík in the semi-finals.

After Stjarnan withdrew the team from the Úrvalsdeild in June 2019, Rodriguez signed with KR. On 13 February 2020 she had 31 points and 11 assists in an overtime victory against defending cup and national champions Valur in the Icelandic Cup final four.

On 15 May 2020, Rodriguez announced that she was retiring from playing professionally to fully focus on her coaching career.

On 4 April 2022, Rodriguez resumed her playing career after a two year hiatus and signed with Grindavík.

Statistics

College statistics

Source

Coaching career
On December 1, 2018, the Icelandic Basketball Federation announced that it had hired Rodriguez as an assistant coach to the Icelandic women's national under-20 basketball team.

In May 2020, Rodriguez was hired as an assistant coach to Stjarnan men's basketball team and became the first woman to serve as a coach in the Icelandic top-tier Úrvalsdeild karla.

In August 2020, Rodriguez was hired as an assistant coach to the Icelandic women's national basketball team.

On 27 September 2020, she won her first medal as a coach when Stjarnan defeated Grindavík in the Icelandic Super Cup.

In August 2021, Rodriguez was named an assistant coach with University of San Diego women's basketball team.

References

External links
Icelandic statistics at kki.is
Utah Utes profile at utahutes.com

1993 births
Living people
21st-century American women
American expatriate basketball people in Iceland
American women's basketball players
Grindavík women's basketball players
KR women's basketball players
Point guards
Stjarnan women's basketball players
Stjarnan women's basketball coaches
Úrvalsdeild karla (basketball) coaches
Úrvalsdeild kvenna basketball coaches
Úrvalsdeild kvenna basketball players